Björn "Bönan" Löf (born 9 March 1945) is a Swedish former footballer who played as a centre-back, best known for representing Hammarby IF.

Club career
In 1962, at age 17, Löf made his senior debut for Hammarby IF in Allsvenskan, Sweden's top tier.

Löf soon established himself as a regular, and became known as tall centre-back with great heading skills. Between 1965 and 1967, Löf won five caps for the Swedish U21's.

He took a break from playing football in 1969 to study, but returned to Hammarby a year later. At the end of 1972, Löf retired from football definitely, aged 27.

In total, Löf played seven seasons in Allsvenskan and three in Division 2, the second tier, with Hammarby. He made 188 league appearances for the club, scoring one goal.

References

1945 births
Living people
Footballers from Stockholm
Swedish footballers
Association football defenders
Allsvenskan players
Hammarby Fotboll players
Sweden under-21 international footballers